The marine worms identified at the Houtman Abrolhos comprise 22 species of the polychaete family Terebellidae, and 16 species of the family oligochaete family Tubificidae.

References

Worms
Worms of the Houtman Abrolhos